Yes, Uncle! is a musical comedy by Austen Hurgon and George Arthurs, with music by Nat D. Ayer and lyrics by Clifford Grey (who also wrote The Bing Boys are Here and the following series of highly successful reviews).  The story is based on the farce Le truc du Brésilien by Nicolas Nancey and Paul Armont, and the musical takes its title from the catch-phrase used by Bobby Summers and Mabel Mannering, addressing Uncle Brabazon Hollybone.  It was produced by George Grossmith, Jr. and Edward Laurillard and opened at the Prince of Wales Theatre in London on 16 December 1917 and ran for a very successful 626 performances.  The piece starred Fred Leslie as G.B. Stark, Margaret Bannerman as Joan and Leslie Henson as Bobby Summers.  Later, Madge Elliott and Cyril Ritchard starred in the musical.

Yes, Uncle! was one of a number of very successful musical hits of the London stage during World War I (the others include a revue entitled The Bing Boys Are Here, the musical The Maid of the Mountains, Chu Chin Chow, a mixture of comic opera and pantomime), The Happy Day (1916), Theodore & Co (1916) and The Boy (1917).  Audiences wanted light and uplifting entertainment during the war, and these shows delivered it.

Principal characters and original cast
Mabel Mannering – Julia James 
Joan – Margaret Bannerman
Bobby Summers – Leslie Henson
G.B. Stark – Fred Leslie
Gustave – Victor Gouriet
Nichette – Lily St. John
Lolita – Alexia Bassian
Diablo – Robert Nainby
Uncle Brabazon Hollybone – Davy Burnaby
Gapour – Henri Leoni

Synopsis

In Paris, Bobby Summers and Mabel Mannering frequently address their Uncle Brab with the catchphrase, "Yes, uncle!".  Bobby is trying to help his friend, the artist George Stark, to disentangle his amatory affairs, and for that purpose, Bobby is temporarily impersonating George, with Mabel pretending to be Mrs. Stark. 

The couple have a quarrel about whether to attend the Four Arts Ball, and Bobby goes on his own, disguised as a French count, in which guise he successfully deceives both Mabel and an old flame, Lolita. Lolita successfully makes a play for rich Uncle Brab.

References

External links
List of longest running plays in London and New York
Cast list and other information about Yes Uncle!

1917 musicals
West End musicals